Osek is a municipality and village in Rokycany District in the Plzeň Region of the Czech Republic. It has about 1,400 inhabitants.

Administrative parts

The village of Vitinka is an administrative part of Osek.

Geography
The built-up area stretches in north-south direction along the road from Rokycany to Břasy. The western part of the municipality, formed by the built-up area and an agricultural landscape, lies in the Švihov Highlands. The eastern part foemrd by forests lies in the Křivoklát Highlands. In the village of Osek, the hill of Kamýk ( above sea level) rises.

The Osecký Stream flows through the village. There are several ponds in the municipality, the set of ponds Karásek, Labutinka, Lukotovský and Nový is supplied by the Osecký Stream.

History
The first written mention of Osek is from 1240, in a deed issued by the King Wenceslaus I of Bohemia to the monastery of Plasy, where a man by name of Budivoj of Osek is referred to. The monastery in Plasy was founder of Osek. The village was dominated by small Gothic fort, rebuilt into a Renaissance castle in the second half of the 16th century.

In following centuries Osek was owned by several aristocratic families. Beside farming, the village specialized in iron ore mining and iron production. This local industry utilized energy from the system of ponds in Osek's proximity and charcoal from nearby forests. Iron ore mining continued until 1850. In the 19th and 20th centuries Osek remained mostly agricultural community.

The village of Vitinka was founded around 1697. It used to be traditionally a part of Osek. In 1924 an independent municipality of Vitinka was created, however in 1980 Vitinka merged with Osek again.

Demographics

Sights
On the top of Kamýk Hill, there are the ruins of an aristocratic summer house. It was built in 1750 and desolated in 1839. A Jewish cemetery is located next to the ruins.

Notable people
Rudolf Wels (1882–1944), architect

References

External links

Villages in Rokycany District